Castledale is an unincorporated community in the Columbia-Shuswap Regional District region of British Columbia. It is located along the Upper Columbia River between Parson and Spillamacheen. British Columbia Highway 95 passes through the community.

References

Unincorporated settlements in British Columbia